The men's alpine skiing giant slalom event was part of the alpine skiing at the 1952 Winter Olympics programme. It was the first appearance of the event at the Olympics. The competition was held on Friday, 15 February 1952 at Norefjell ski area and started at 1 p.m.

Eighty-three alpine skiers from 26 nations competed.

Results
Friday, 15 February 1952

References

External links
Official Olympic Report
 

Men's alpine skiing at the 1952 Winter Olympics